Steve McCutcheon (born 15 January 1972), known professionally as Steve Mac, is a British record producer, songwriter and musician. A multi-award-winning producer, he is one of the most prolific songwriters and record producers in modern British music, with contributions to 30 number one singles in the UK Singles Chart.

Career

Early career 
Mac got his break in the music industry in the early 1990s when he wrote and produced the Nomad hit "(I Wanna Give You) Devotion", that reached no.2 in the UK Singles Chart. In 1992, he became part of dance group Undercover, who had several European hit singles, including "Baker Street" and "Never Let Her Slip Away".

He then met songwriter Wayne Hector, with the pair striking up a  partnership that has seen them co-write and produce a range of chart songs.

Mac has gone on to work with some of the most recognised names in the music industry. He has written, co-written and produced hits for musicians including Ed Sheeran, Melanie C, Pink, Westlife, Little Mix, and many other UK and international singers.

From his Rokstone Studios in London, the artists he has written and produced for have racked up over 200 million sales worldwide during his career. As well as a string of no.1 UK and international hits, Mac has also penned top 10 singles for artists such as Calvin Harris, Demi Lovato, One Direction, The Saturdays, Leona Lewis, and Rita Ora, among others.

Work with Westlife 
The producer has had a long-standing collaboration with Irish boyband, Westlife, dating back to the late 1990s. This artistic partnership resulted in him co-writing and producing four no.1 UK singles for the band. He has co-produced another five no.1 hits and produced three top five singles. Mac also co-wrote and produced the band's 2000 hit Christmas single, "What Makes a Man" reaching no.2 in the UK singles chart.

2010–2017 
Mac won the first of his two Brit Awards in 2010 for co-writing and producing the no.1 single "Beat Again" for British pop/R&B band, JLS.

In 2012, the producer worked with a host of artists including Little Mix, The Wanted, The Saturdays, Susan Boyle, Il Divo, Boyzone, and Gareth Gates.

Mac was recognised in 2012, and then again in 2013 by picking up the ASCAP Song of the Year Award. The awards were in recognition of co-writing and producing the hits "Glad You Came" for The Wanted, and "You Make Me Feel..." by Cobra Starship, respectively.

Between 2013 and 2015, Mac worked with several musicians include James Blunt, John Newman, Union J, Calvin Harris, The Vamps, and Demi Lovato. He made several contributions to both James Blunt's Moon Landing album that reached no.2 in the UK album chart and The Vamps’ Wake Up album that was a top 10 hit.

Mac scored another number one hit in 2016 with "Rockabye" by Clean Bandit featuring Sean Paul and Anne-Marie. The song reached the top of the UK singles chart, staying there for nine consecutive weeks. The single also won in the EDM Winning Songs category alongside his other co-produced track for Clean Bandit and Zara Larsson, "Symphony".

In 2017, Mac picked up the Songwriter of the Year and Producer of the Year at the Music Business Worldwide A&R Awards and the ASCAP Founders Award for "his pioneering contribution to music, global success and a 27 year body of work".

The same year, Mac co-wrote Ed Sheeran's No. 1 single "Shape of You" with Sheeran and Johnny McDaid. The song broke chart history, spending 14 weeks at the top of the UK chart, and remaining in the Top 10 of the Billboard Hot 100 in the US for 33 weeks. It also claimed the unique achievement of being the most-streamed song of all time on Spotify.

He also received another Grammy nomination for Pink's US top twenty single "What About Us", which he wrote and produced.

2018–present 
2018 saw the producer work with some of music's most prolific names such as Scottish group Chvrches, Years & Years, Celine Dion, Little Mix, Craig David, and Westlife.

Mac won the 2018 Brit Award for British Producer of the Year. As well as the Brit Award, he also won both Songwriter of the Year and Song of the Year at the Annual ASCAP Pop Music Awards 2018 in LA.

In another award recognising Mac's work, the multi-platinum hit "Shape of You" he co-wrote and produced for Ed Sheeran picked up both a Grammy Award and the Ivor Novello Award for PRS for Music Most Performed Work in 2017.

Awards 
Brit Awards 2018:

British Producer of the Year

35th Annual ASCAP Pop Music Awards 2018

Songwriter of the Year:

Song of the Year – Shape of You, Ed Sheeran | Strip That Down, Liam Payne ft. Quavo | Rockabye, Clean Bandit ft. Sean Paul | What About Us, P!nk

Music Business Worldwide A&R Awards 2017

Producer of the Year

Songwriter of the Year

ASCAP Song of the Year Awards 2013

Glad You Came, The Wanted: (Co-writer & Co-producer)

ASCAP Song of the Year Awards 2012

You Make Me Feel... Cobra Starship: (Co-writer & Co-producer)

Brit Awards 2010

Song of the Year: Beat Again, JLS (Co-written with Wayne Hector)

BMI Awards 2001

Pop Award: Swear It Again, Westlife (Co-written with Wayne Hector)

Songwriting and production discography

References 

1972 births
Living people
Ivor Novello Award winners
English songwriters
English record producers
People from Chertsey